Parlour X is a luxury fashion boutique based in Sydney, Australia. It was founded by Eva Galambos in 2001, in the Sydney suburb of Paddington.

History 
Eva Galambos started her career in fashion working for Armani, where she received her training in fabrication, visual merchandising and operating systems. Later she was involved in the company’s launch of Arena magazine. Upon her return to Australia in 2001, she founded Parlour X.

Parlour X offers a selection from various designers including Céline, Chloè, Balenciaga, Saint Laurent, Stella McCartney, Loewe, Comme des Garcons and Isabel Marant, plus Australian designers like Ellery, Maticevski and Romance was Born.

In 2009, the boutique launched its e-commerce business. In May 2015, Parlour X announced its relocation from Fiveways Paddington into St John’s Baptist Church Paddington, as of August 2015.

Awards 
In April 2015, Parlour X won the 2015 Prix De Marie Claire, from the magazine Marie Claire, for "best Australian boutique". In 2016, it won the Australian Fashion Laureate for "best Australian retailer".

References 

Clothing retailers of Australia
Australian fashion
Paddington
Australian companies established in 2001